The 1984 All-Ireland Senior Football Championship Final was the 97th All-Ireland Final and the deciding match of the 1984 All-Ireland Senior Football Championship, an inter-county Gaelic football tournament for the top teams in Ireland.

Pre-game
Dublin were considered hot favourites to defeat Kerry. Kerry had lost to Offaly on their last appearance at this stage in 1982 and had not made it past Cork in the 1983 final of the Munster Senior Football Championship.

Match

Summary
Tom Spillane and Ger Lynch — assigned to mark Tommy Conroy and Barney Rock — began their efforts during the national anthem, which they sang with aplomb. Spillane, quoted in the book Princes of Pigskin, said of this tactic later: "There was no belting but the plot was to sing the National Anthem as loud as we could into their ears to put the fear of God into them. Neither of us were great singers but they must have thought we were wired to the moon".

Kerry controlled the game and won by five points, only two Dublin forwards scoring. Dublin were well beaten (0–14 to 1–6). Kerry claimed great motivation for their victory came from a piece in the RTÉ Guide in which the team were referred to as "a cowardly blend of experienced players, has-beens and a few newcomers."

It was the third of five All-Ireland football titles won by Kerry in the 1980s.

Details

References

All-Ireland Senior Football Championship Final
All-Ireland Senior Football Championship Final, 1984
All-Ireland Senior Football Championship Finals
All-Ireland Senior Football Championship Finals
Dublin county football team matches
Kerry county football team matches